The Western Electric Company was an American electrical engineering and manufacturing company officially founded in 1869. A subsidiary of the American Telephone and Telegraph Company for most of its lifespan, it served as the primary equipment manufacturer, supplier, and purchasing agent for the Bell System from 1881 until 1984, when the system was dismantled. The company was responsible for many technological innovations, as well as developments in industrial management.

History

In 1856, George Shawk, a craftsman and telegraph maker, purchased an electrical engineering business in Cleveland, Ohio.

In January 1869, Shawk had partnered with Enos M. Barton in the former Western Union repair shop of Cleveland, to manufacture burglar alarms, fire alarms, and other electrical items. Both men were former Western Union employees. Shawk, was the Cleveland shop foreman and Barton, was a Rochester, New York telegrapher. During this Shawk and Barton partnership, one customer was an inventor sourcing parts and models for experiments. That inventor was Elisha Gray, a former physics professor at Oberlin College. Barton thought of future growth in electrical apparatus potential for the company and shared a common enthusiasm from the inventor having interest in leading a manufacturing plant capable of long-term developments. Shawk found those plans were beyond his business goals and offered to sell his half-interest partnership to Gray. Anson Stager, a former Chief of the U.S. Military Telegraphs during the Civil War, advanced money for Gray to buy the half-interest and become a partner when Gray and Barton moved operations to Chicago. Gray and Barton previously knew Stager and an agreement was signed on November 18, 1869, to the deal as Gray & Barton. The firm was open for business by the end of the year in Chicago. In December 1869, the location was at 162 South Water Street in Chicago.  

On December 31, 1869, he entered a partnership with Barton, and later sold his share to inventor Gray. In 1872, Barton and Gray moved the business to Clinton Street, Chicago, Illinois, and incorporated it as the Western Electric Manufacturing Company. They manufactured a variety of electrical products including typewriters, alarms, and lighting and had a close relationship with telegraph company Western Union, to whom they supplied relays and other equipment.

In 1875, Gray sold his interests to Western Union, including the caveat that he had filed against Alexander Graham Bell's patent application for the telephone. The ensuing legal battle between Western Union and the Bell Telephone Company over patent rights ended in 1879 with Western Union withdrawing from the telephone market and Bell acquiring Western Electric in 1881. This purchase was a crucial step in standardizing telephone instruments and concentrating manufacturing in a single entity.

The first few years of the decade old company foundation, there were five manufacturing locations located at Chicago (220-232 Kinzie St.) New York, Boston, Indianapolis and
Antwerp, Belgium. The locations were not permanent, as the headquarters in Chicago had moved to a new building on Clinton Street, the New York shop had moved two city blocks to a new building on Greenwich Street, and both Boston and Indianapolis factories closed. The Antwerp location was at the same location under Western Electric operations until sold in 1925 to ITT.

In April 1879, the New York Shop was located at 62-68 New Church Street, Lower Manhattan, New York. Western Union had a factory at that location and the Western Electric company known as W.E. Mfg. Co., at the time, had purchased Western Union's New York Factory to continue the increase of phone production. This site would also place the end to Western Union factories.

The Boston shop was located at 109-115 Court Street and it was previously as the Charles Williams, Jr factory that was purchased by Western Electric in 1882.  The consolidation of operations was done in 1884 to Chicago and New York factories by Charles Williams becoming a Western electric Manager.

In 1888–1889, Western Electric built a 10-story factory building at 125 Greenwich Street in Lower Manhattan, to manufacture some of the first telephones. The New York Shop that was renting the Western Union building moved to this building. 

In preparation for the Chicago Worlds Fair of 1892, Western Electric was responsible for the organized Bell System sales activities and merchandising of apparatus for the 900 long-distance circuit from New York to Chicago.

In 1897, the building at 463 West Street, New York was constructed and housed the New York shop as well as the company Eastern headquarters.

Western Electric was the first company to join in a Japanese joint venture with foreign capital. In 1899, it invested in a 54% share of the Nippon Electric Company, Ltd. Western Electric's representative in Japan was Walter Tenney Carleton.

In 1901, Western Electric secretly purchased a controlling interest in a principal competitor, the Kellogg Switchboard & Supply Company, but in 1909 was forced by a lawsuit to sell back to Milo Kellogg.

The Manufacturers Junction Railway Company was incorporated in January 1903 to provide rail connections to major railroad systems. There
were approximately 13 miles of track in and out of Hawthorne Works for rail freight of inbound materials and outbound finished products. Western Electric had a tenure of 50 years upto 1952, in the responsibility and operation of its use for Hawthorne and other nearby industrial companies.

Also, in 1903, the construction of Hawthorne Works first buildings were authorized by Barton.

In 1907, the research and development staffs of Western Electric and AT&T were consolidated to 463 West Street, New York. The location served the newly Western Electric Engineering Department for the responsibility of the testing and inspection of its telephones and equipment. AT&T's Engineering Department retained the responsibility for the growth of the Bell System with compatible equipment and service. Gradually the consolidation improved and advanced the telephony response to expanding use.

On July 24, 1915, employees of the Hawthorne Works boarded the SS Eastland in downtown Chicago for a company picnic. The ship rolled over at the dock and over 800 people died.

In 1920, Alice Heacock Seidel was the first of Western Electric's female employees to be given permission to stay on after she had married. This set a precedent in the company, which previously had not allowed married women in their employ. Miss Heacock had worked for Western Electric for sixteen years before her marriage, and was at the time the highest-paid secretary in the company. In her memoirs, she wrote that the decision to allow her to stay on "required a meeting of the top executives to decide whether I might remain with the Company, for it established a precedent and a new policy for the Company – that of married women in their employ. If the women at the top were permitted to remain after marriage then all women would expect the same privilege. How far and how fast the policy was expanded is shown by the fact that a few years later women were given maternity leaves with no loss of time on their service records."

Western Electric was expanding beyond making telephone equipment and American Bell noticed its division from a manufacturing business to a supply business. Western Electric decided to split in 1921, the supply department from the manufacturing business and this led later to a separate entity.

In 1925, ITT purchased the Bell Telephone Manufacturing Company of Brussels, Belgium, and other worldwide subsidiaries from AT&T, to avoid an antitrust action. The company manufactured rotary system switching equipment under the Western Electric brand.

Early on, Western Electric also managed an electrical equipment distribution business, furnishing its customers with non-telephone products made by other manufacturers This electrical distribution business was spun off from Western Electric in 1925 and organized into a separate company, Graybar Electric Company, in honor of the company's founders, Elisha Gray and Enos Barton.

Bell Telephone Laboratories, created from the engineering department of Western Electric in 1925, was half-owned by Western Electric, the other half belonging to AT&T.

The company began to increase its presence in other sectors of industry for new products. In September 1931, the Teletype Corporation headquartered in Chicago on Wrightwood Ave, became a subsidiary of Western Electric and it was a manufacturer of teletypewriters for TWX services.  There was the acquisition in 1931 of the Nassau Smelting and Refining plant located in Totenville, Staten Island, New York to recycle Bell System scrap wire, metal, and becoming a subsidiary of Western Electric. The acquisition of the Queensboro factory in Middle Village, New York became a Western Electric Shop in the 1930s to produce wooden telephone booths.

In 1974, the IBEW members at Western Electrics 16 plants went on strike over improved benefits, cost‐of‐living adjustments, and pay increase for up to three years. The ratified contract was agreed on September 3, 1974, with employees at 13 plants returning to work. Only the company's subsidiary Teletype Corporation plant in Little Rock, Arkansas and two plants, the Columbia River Switching Equipment factory in Vancouver, Washington and in San Ramon, California were subject to ratification or in negotiations to settle local agreements.

In 1983, corporate announcements were made at the three oldest manufacturing facilities for product manufacturing transfers and employee expected layoffs. The Kearny Works facility that made systems to convert commercial power to run various telecom equipment, would transfer remaining work to Dallas Works. The shutdown of the plant would eliminate 4,000 jobs. The Baltimore Works facility that made connectors and protectors for wire and cable had work moved to Omaha Works. A total of 2,300 jobs were potentially eliminated after that announcement. The Hawthorne Works facility, had the operations for pulp cable relocated to Phoenix Works. A loss of 400 positions were expected eliminated in the process.

After the Bell System breakup, Western Electric facilities were known as AT&T Technologies facilities in 1984. The three largest and oldest facilities, Hawthorne Works, Kearny Works, and Baltimore Works were closed shortly after due to “excess space”.

Company logos
Western Electric used various logos during its existence. Starting in 1914 it used an image of a statue originally named Electricity, but later renamed Spirit of Communication, which was raised to the roof of195 Broadway on October 24, 1916.

Presidents

Development of a monopoly

In 1915, the assets of Western Electric Manufacturing were transferred to a newly incorporated company in New York, New York, named Western Electric Company, Inc, a wholly owned subsidiary of AT&T. The sole reason for the transfer was to provide for the issuance of a non-voting preferred class of capital stock, disallowed under the statutes of the state of Illinois.

In the Bell System, telephones were leased by the operating companies to subscribers, and remained the property of the Bell System. Service subscribers paid a monthly fee included in the service charge, while paying additionally for special types or features of telephones, such as colored telephone sets. Equipment repair was included in the fees. This system had the effect of subsidizing basic telephone service, keeping local telephone service inexpensive, under $10 per month. After divestiture, basic service prices increased, and customers became responsible for inside building wiring and telephone equipment. The Bell System had an extensive policy and infrastructure to recycle or refurbish equipment taken out of service, replacing all defective, weak, or otherwise unusable parts for new installations. This resulted in extraordinary longevity of Western Electric telephones, and limited the variety of new designs introduced into the market place. This led Western Electric to pursue extreme reliability and durability in design to minimize service calls. In particular, the work of Walter A. Shewhart, who developed new techniques for statistical quality control in the 1920s, helped lead to the quality of manufacture of Western Electric telephones.

AT&T also strictly enforced policies against using telephone equipment by other manufacturers on their network. A customer who insisted on using a telephone not supplied by the Bell System had to first transfer the phone to the local Bell operating company, who leased the phone back to the customer for a monthly charge in addition to a re-wiring fee. In the 1970s when consumers increasingly bought telephone sets from other manufacturers, AT&T changed the policy for its Design Line telephone series by selling customers the phone housing, retaining ownership of the internal mechanical and electrical components, which still required paying AT&T a monthly leasing fee.

Starting in 1983 with the breakup of the Bell System, Western Electric telephones could be sold to the public under the brand name American Bell, a newly created subsidiary of AT&T. One of the terms of the Modification of Final Judgment in the Bell System divestiture procedures prohibited AT&T from using the name Bell after January 1, 1984; prior to this, AT&T's plan was to market products and services under the American Bell name, accompanied by the now familiar AT&T globe logo.

Manufacturing plants

In 1903, Western Electric began construction of the first buildings for Hawthorne Works on the outskirts of Chicago. In 1905, the Clinton Street power apparatus shops moved to Hawthorne. 

Further expansion of large factories began in the 1920s. In 1923, construction began on the second factory located in Kearny, New Jersey. The location was known as Kearny Works and in 1925 began telephone cable production. In 1929, work began at Point Breeze, Baltimore, Maryland as the third manufacturing location, Baltimore Works, began its occupancy by 1930 for various cable and wire production.

Two manufacturing plants in Lincoln, Nebraska were leased in 1943 to Western Electric to manufacture signal corps equipment and later production demands from Hawthorne Works. The Eighth Street building, known as "Lincoln Shops," and the 13th Street building were the locations, the latter was sold in 1950 for $500,000 to Western Electric. The plants were closed after the Omaha Works opened in 1958.

Western Electric acquired in 1943, the old Grad and Winchell buildings located at Haverhill, Massachusetts. New Jersey supervisors taught former textile and shoe workers the manufacturing process of coil winding. The employees' acquired skills demonstrated their versatility in this new manufacturing process for a Western Electric decision to join Haverhill and Lawrence locations in 1956 as the Merrimack Valley Works.

In 1944, Western Electric purchased a factory in St. Paul, Minnesota to restart manufacture of telephone sets for civilian installation as authorized by War Production Board. By 1946, some of these facilities were relocated to the Hawthorne plant as space became available from war-production scale down.

Also, the reduced production of home telephones because of the war, began to have a backlog of two million orders in late 1945 for the Hawthorne plant. Western Electric had acquired a former Studebaker plant on Archer Avenue (Chicago, Illinois) for assemblers that produced out one hundred thousand Model 302s telephones by March 1946.

After World War II, the National Carbon Company left a facility that had manufactured United States Navy submarine batteries and underwater detonators in Winston-Salem. This facility at 800 Chatham Road, was passed to Western Electric Company and operated until 1966 for production of national telephone companies' switches and circuits. Additionally, the location complex was one of three nationwide Western Electric field engineering sites.

The mid 1940s brought occupancy to locations. A plant was established in 1946 at Tonawanda, New York to produce equipment wiring cable, telephone cords, enamelled wire, and insulated wire. This plant was called "Buffalo Plant." A satellite shop was established in Jersey City, New Jersey called "Marion Shops" and occupied in 1947. This location produced portable test sets, rectifiers, and power equipment for the main plant known as the Kearny Works.

In July 1948, the equipment plant at Duluth, Minnesota was involved in the National Labors Act with bargaining units of IAM and IBEW.

After 1947, eight Works locations were built and occupied by 1961 at Allentown, Indianapolis, North Carolina, Merrimack Valley, Omaha, Columbus, Oklahoma City, and Kansas City for the high volume of manufacturing products. The North Carolina Works was located in Winston-Salem, North Carolina. The Merrimack Valley Works location was in North Andover, Massachusetts. The Kansas City Works location was in Lee's Summit, Missouri.

A Lawrence, Massachusetts factory opened on November 13, 1951, and was called the "Garfield Shops." The location started with as a wired units job and there were thirteen workers with a section chief and one maintenance man. In 1955, the Lawrence plant reached its peak employment at more than 2,000 employees. This Bell Labs research and development satellite had 40 Bell Telephone Laboratories engineers and 25 Western Electric employees. Carrier equipment used filters made with Polystyrene condensers at this Garfield Shops or later referred as Lawrence Shops.

In 1952, the Reading plant began when Western Electric converted an old Rosedale knitting mill in Laureldale into a factory. On August 22, 1952, the facility opened to produced new electronic components for the U.S. government for use by the military and the space program.<ref>{{cite news|title=Reading Towne 1748-1998; Reading (PA), US|work= Reading Eagle Press |page=141}}</ref>

In the mid 1950s, Western Electric established several more satellite "Shops" that were smaller locations reporting to the larger "Works" locations. The "Montgomery Shops" were occupied in 1955 to produce Data-Phone data sets, wire spring relays, and test sets. Although, it was located in Montgomery, Illinois, it reported and supported production of the main plant, Hawthorne Works in Cicero, Illinois. The Kearny Works facility had satellite shops that were apart from its location but were part of the manufacturing process. Located in Fair Lawn, New Jersey and occupied since 1956, the "Fair Lawn Shops" produced coils, resistors, transformers, and keys under Kearny manufacturing. The Indianapolis Works facility was producing telephone sets and components with a satellite shop. The Indianapolis shop known as "Washington Street Shop" produced miscellaneous subscriber apparatus since its occupancy in 1957. The "Lawrence Shop" that was occupied in 1957 produced BELLBoy receivers, telephone repeaters and carrier products under Merrimack Valley Works. The "Clark Shop" was occupied in 1959 at Clark, New Jersey and manufactured submarine cable repeaters and components. The satellite shop was under Kearny Works.

The 1960s and 1970s had various new facilities built and occupied by Western Electric to produce new technologies such as electronic switching equipment (Dallas and North Illinois,) fiber optic cable networks (Atlanta,) power systems (Phoenix,) business equipment (Denver) and telephone equipment (Shreveport.) 

In 1970, Western Electric purchased land in Bishop Ranch, San Ramon, California for a permanent plant. The 200,000 square-foot leased plant began in June 1971. In 1974, there were 490 I. B. E. W. employee members on strike over local agreement issues. In 1975, this San Ramon Valley Plant announced a September 30 closure of its telephone transmission equipment manufacturing operations.

On January 27, 1983, the Kearny facility was announced for closure due to technology changes, underutilized, and too costly to maintain. The phase out of the facility jobs started in fall of 1983 and the 59 year old, 3 million-square-foot, 144-acre facility was sold officially on May 21, 1984, with nearly 1000 last employees left at the plant. The former facility was purchased and later existed as warehouses, distribution, research and light manufacturing facilities.

As modern facilities around the country were used for the operations of Hawthorne and its productions distributed, announcement was made on June 24, 1983, for closure. Between 1975 and 1983, the Foundry and most of the Telephone Apparatus buildings were demolished and in 1986–1987, the remaining Telephone Apparatus buildings and the Executive Tower were demolished. The Hawthorne facility was in operations for 83 years when it closed its doors in 1986 and torn down for a shopping center. Another building was demolished on April 10, 1994, for a shopping center parking lot, with a remaining two buildings converted. A water tower is the remaining physical association of the industrial research complex where telephones, electronics, military equipment and business management innovations were produced by a facility that once existed.

The Baltimore facility closed on February 28, 1986. The facility, which had once employed 6,200, was staffed by 65 employees on the closure date.

By the time AT&T was dissolved in the early 1980s, more than twenty production plants around the country ("Works" locations) had been established.

In 1967, a telephone directory provides the following snapshot of manufacturing facilities: 

Technological innovations

In 1926, Western Electric issued the first Bell System telephone with a handset containing both the transmitter and receiver in the same unit. Previous telephones had been of the candlestick type which featured a stationary transmitter in the desktop set or the wall-mounted unit, and a hand-held receiver to be placed on the user's ear. The first version of the desktop unit was constructed by shortening the candlestick shaft to about an inch in height and placing a handset cradle on the top. This was the A-type handset mounting, which was replaced by 1928 by the B handset mounting, which featured a streamlined shape integrating the shaft as a short neck for the cradle. It still had the same circular footprint of the candlestick, which proved too unstable when dialing numbers, and was henceforth replaced with a wider design using an oval footprint, the D-type base in 1930.

Concurrently with the mechanical advances, the electrical circuitry of Western Electric telephones saw advances in sidetone reduction. Sidetone is feedback by which the users of the telephone can hear their own voice in the receiver. While a desirable property, this feedback, when too loud, causes most users to lower their voice volume to unacceptable levels. Until after the introduction in 1930 of the D handset mountings, sets still contained no active sidetone compensation. Such handset telephone types were designated with the assembly code 102, while later models containing anti-sidetone circuitry were the type 202 telephone set. These early desktop telephones relied on an additional desk set box or subscriber set (subset) containing the ringer with gongs, the induction coil, and capacitors to interface with the telephone network. These subscriber sets were typically mounted on a wall near the operating location for the telephone.

In 1936 the model 302 telephone was announced, which was the first Western Electric instrument that combined the desktop telephone set with the subscriber set and ringer in one unit. It became the mainstay of American telephone service well into the 1950s, and was followed by the model 500 telephone starting in 1950, which became the most extensively produced telephone model in the industry's history. The 500-set was continually updated over time, reflecting new materials and manufacturing processes, such as quieter and smoother dial gearing and a printed circuit board for the network electronics. The model 500 was discontinued in 1986, in favor of the type 2500, that had been available since 1969. The 2500-series employed dual-tone multi-frequency (DTMF) signaling for transmitting digits to the central office, replacing the rotary dial. DTMF technology was referred to by the trademark Touch-Tone.

Further innovations were evident when in 1954, the production of color telephones began to outproduce the black sets. Later, for 1958, production of the nite-light telephone, the Speakerphone, and the CALL DIRECTOR telephone were done at Indianapolis Works.Other innovations included the Princess telephones of the 1960s, followed shortly by the Trimline models.

Western Electric's switching equipment development commenced in the mid-1910s with the rotary system and the panel switch, later several generations of cross-bar switches, and finally the development of several generations of electronic switching systems (ESS). The No. 1 ESS was first installed in 1965. The 4ESS was the first digital toll switching system, implemented in 1976. Finally, in 1981, the 5ESS was implemented throughout the United States.

In 1929, Western Electric entered as a market competitor for early cinema sound systems. It created the Western Electric Universal Base, a device by which early silent cinema projectors could be adapted to screen sound films. Western Electric designed a wide-audio-range horn loudspeaker for cinemas. This was estimated to be 25% efficient, thus allowing a cinema to be filled with sound from a 3-watt amplifier. This was an important breakthrough in 1929 because high-powered audio valves (tubes) were not generally available.

In addition to being a supplier to the Bell System, Western Electric played a major role in the development and production of professional sound recording and reproducing equipment, including:

 the Vitaphone system which brought sound to the movies;
 the electrical recording technology adopted by record companies in the late 1920s (despite the popular electrical system used by Autograph Records and its manager, Orlando R. Marsh);
 the Orthophonic phonograph, an acoustical phonograph with a flat frequency response tailored for reproduction of electrically recorded disks;
 the Westrex (variable density) optical sound that succeeded it for motion picture film production and release prints;
 the Westrex magnetic sound (mono and stereo) that succeeded it for motion picture film production (until the Swiss made Kudelski monaural Nagra III was adopted by Hollywood) and a few productions' release prints;
 the Westrex stereo variable-area optical sound that succeeded it for low-cost stereo release prints;
 the Westrex (Model 3, and derivatives) cutter and system for recording stereophonic sound in a single-groove gramophone record (StereoDisk®) that was compatible with monophonic equipment.
For these reasons, many American films of this period feature the Western Electric/Westrex logo in their on-screen credits.

In 1950, at the start of the Cold War, Western Electric was selected to build the first demonstrator for the SOSUS anti-submarine sound surveillance system. Later, the company was prime contractor for the Safeguard anti-ballistic missile system, which operated briefly from 1975.

Manufacturing innovations
Western Electric also invested heavily in improving processes and equipment to manufacture their products.

In 1958, the company established the Engineering Research Center (ERC) near Princeton, New Jersey. With a charter distinct from Bell Labs, Western Electric's ERC was one of the first research organizations solely dedicated to the advancement of manufacturing-focused, rather than product-focused science. Here, more than 400 researchers and engineers worked to bring new manufacturing technologies into the company's production environment. Their developments included computer-driven mathematical models and related statistical quality-control systems to improve production flow and logistics, novel metal-forming techniques, circuit board assembly automation, fiber-optic waveguide manufacturing techniques, application of lasers for industrial processes and early efforts in cleanroom robotics for semiconductor production. In the early 1970s, some of the first practical Ion Implanters to make integrated circuits were also developed at ERC and later deployed at Western Electric's chip-making factories.

Although the ERC was later integrated into Bell Labs, it – along with AT&T's nearby Corporate Education Center – was closed by the late 1990s, victims of the deregulation of telecommunications, shrinking revenues from long-distance calls and accelerating innovation in telephone equipment by an increasing number of global manufacturing players.

Management innovations
Western Electric were pioneers of the scientific management of Frederick Winslow Taylor.
Walter A. Shewhart developed the control chart at the Hawthorne Works in 1924.
Joseph M. Juran pioneered the use of statistical analysis for quality assurance at the Hawthorne Works.
At Hawthorne Works, Cicero, Illinois, Elton Mayo conducted research of the effect on manufacturing productivity of lighting changes and work structure changes, such as working hours or break times. The reactivity identified in the studies became known as the Hawthorne effect.
The Hawthorne experiments in industrial productivity were conducted there from 1924 to 1936.
Western Electric's reputation for sound management was such that in 1949 President Truman requested that Western Electric manage a major defense laboratory, Sandia National Labs.

National Defense and NIKE-ZEUS
Western Electric was authorized on November 15, 1955, with Air Force Contract AF33(616)-3285 to conduct a competitive study directed specifically only to Anti-ICBM (AICBM) defense. In February 1957, the U.S. Army awarded the company, as a contractor, responsibility in developing an AICBM defense system called NIKE-ZEUS. On February 12, 1959, a test program for NIKE-ZEUS was approved by Department of Defense for Kwajalein as the down-range test site. After the site was inspected on August 4, 1959, by Western Electric project managers and various agencies/contractors, the completion of the technical building and launch facilities were done. Shortly after, Western Electric equipment engineers and installers arrived for the installation of the NIKE-ZEUS test site. The North Carolina plant made the R&D models for the system elements and installed, tested, and operated the components at the test site.

NASA and Project Mercury
In 1960, NASA awarded Western Electric a contract for over $33,000,000 for engineering and construction of a tracking system for the Project Mercury program. As part of this effort, Western Electric engineers trained remote-site flight controllers and Project Mercury control center and operations personnel.

Closure
As of January 1, 1984, a newly formed company, AT&T Technologies, Inc., assumed the corporate charter of Western Electric, which was split into several divisions, each focusing on a particular type of customer, e.g., AT&T Technology Systems, and AT&T Network Systems. Telephones made by Western Electric prior to the breakup continued to be manufactured and marked with the company emblem, however, lacking the Bell System logo, or having it hidden by metal filler inside of all telephone housings and most components, including new electronic integrated circuits with the initials WE. Electronic switching systems, outside plant materials, and other equipment produced for the consumption of the RBOCs continued to be marked "AT&T Western Electric" well into the 1990s.

Cost-cutting measures resulted in the consumer telephones being redesigned and modernized in 1985, as well as more plastic being used in place of metal in the 500 & 2500 series phones, as well as the Princess. In 1986, the Indianapolis Works telephone plant closed, and US production of AT&T single-line home telephones ended. Business telephones and systems continued production in the Shreveport Works plant until 2001. Home telephones were redesigned, and production was moved to Hong Kong, Singapore, China, and Thailand. Western Electric no longer marked housings of telephones with "WE", but continued to mark the modular plugs of telephone cords with "WE".

Western Electric came to an end in 1995 when AT&T changed the name of AT&T Technologies to Lucent Technologies, in preparation for its spinoff. Lucent became independent in 1996, and sold more assets into Advanced American Telephones, Agere Systems, Avaya, and Consumer Phone Services. Lucent itself merged with Alcatel, forming Alcatel-Lucent, which was acquired by Nokia in 2016. Western Electric's structured cabling unit, once known as AT&T Network Systems or SYSTIMAX, was spun off from Avaya and became part of CommScope.

Subsequent developments

Since the demise of Western Electric, telephone equipment design and manufacturing is an open market place in which numerous manufacturers compete. As a result, modern telephones are now manufactured in Asia, generally using less expensive components and labor.

Some telephone subscribers declined to purchase their existing telephones after the AT&T breakup, and continued to lease their existing Western Electric models from QLT Consumer Lease Services, formerly known as AT&T Consumer Lease Services. Such subscribers paid leasing fees for their telephones far in excess of the purchase price, but the phones were perceived by some users to be superior to telephones commonly made today in aspects of durability and sound quality. Today, many of these Western Electric telephones have become collector's items.

Western Electric's audio equipment from the 1920s and 30s, designed to be used in movie theaters, is now prized by collectors and audiophiles due to its quality construction and sound reproduction. This includes its massive horn loudspeakers designed to fill a large theater with sound from a relatively low-powered tube amplifier.

 Name acquisition 

In 1994, the stylized brand name Western Electric was acquired as the trademark of the Western Electric Export Corporation, a privately owned high-end audio company in Rossville, Georgia.  The company specializes in manufacturing vacuum tubes and high end audio equipment.  Amongst other products, the company has revived the Western Electric 300B electron tube.

Publications

During the span of its existence of over a dozen decades, Western Electric published a variety of publications for various audiences, including periodicals for employees and customers.

The first employee magazine was Western Electric News, commencing in March 1912 (Volume 1, Number 1) under company president Harry Bates Thayer. Its purpose was to provide a forum where ideas could be exchanged, the company events and activities could be recorded, and to serve as clearing house for technical and commercial information of value to the employee.

In November 1935, Western Electric published a magazine, Pickups, for its developments in sound transmissions, mostly for its radio and communications customers. The magazine changed its name to Oscillator after the May 1942 issue was published and returned in September 1944 with the issue after a hiatus. There are approximately thirty-three issues archived of Western Electric's radio history up to November 1948.

In 1948, Western Electric began publishing the monthly house magazine WE for employees of the company. The magazine was published into the 1980s.
 
Starting in 1957, Western Electric published The Western Electric Engineer, later known as The Engineer, on a subscription basis.

Educational films

Western Electric produced many educational and marketing films that focused on the products associated with telephony or the company's inventions. For example,
 "Finding His Voice" (1929, B/W) is an animated cartoon synchronized to voice and sound. This was advanced using the Western Electric Sound System on films when there were silent movies presently being shown. The animation indicates using a sound booth to pickup sound on a microphone, which was a telephone transmitter. The film explains the process of using a machine to record sound to film. The cartoon shows a picture and sound projector, called the Vitaphone and invented in 1926.
 "Bottling Electrons" (1930s, Silent Film. B/W) is a treatise on the manufacture of vacuum tubes. The Vacuum Tube Shop was at Hawthorne Works. The manufacturing process is shown at segments of video time as follows: "The film starts with images of stems being made (1:00) with women feeding leads into die block at (2:00). At 2:20 finished stems are placed in an annealer from the die block. At 2:57 the Assembly Department is shown with staff, most of them women, working on the tubes by hand. At 3:58 spot welding of tubes is shown, with a woman dexterously moving a stem into the welding gun. At 5:18 the assembly is sealed in a bulb. At 7:31 vacuum tube exhaust stations are shown. At 7:55 a tube is sealed on an exhaust header. At 9:25 magnesium getter is flashed using high frequency electric current. At 9:50 filament, grid and plate leads are disassembled. At 11:30 the fire setting without measured pressure is shown."
 "A Miracle for Mrs. Smith" (1940s, B/W) is a film story using applied scientific detail and technical information on "How the Bell telephone system works and how Western Electric manufacturers the materials and products used in the telephone industry."
 "Adventure In Telezonia" (1950, Color) is a puppet film to learn proper telephone usage. The significance of the film goes to using puppets in a storytelling method by the Producer/puppeteer Bil Baird.
 "A Family Affair" (1955, Color) is a promotional film about using telephones in a home environment. There is an appearance by Actor Stephen McQueen (Steve McQueen) and other actors portraying the family in the credits.
 "Tools of Telephony" (1956, Color. Version 1) introduces telephones, cables, and switching frames that were made, installed, warehoused, or were bought by Western Electric. The film promoted the manufacturing and supply unit for the Bell System with twenty-one manufacturing locations, seventeen installation areas, purchasing systems for its plants and operating companies, and twenty-nine distribution chain warehouses.
 "Tools of Telephony" (1958 Color. Version 2) introduced the teletype, remote feeding of electronic brain calculators, nationwide television transmission, remote control of systems for industry, and added telephones. It promoted the manufacturing and supply unit for the Bell System with manufacturing locations, seventeen installation areas, purchasing system, and chain (30) of distribution houses.
 "Speedy Cutover Service" (1984 Color) A Pacific Telephone Central Office in Glendale, California will have the 35,000 line step-to-step switches exchanged to an electronic switching system. Fifty-one Western Electric installers with three supervisors were assigned and prepared to cut 927 cables on the old mechanical equipment. The cables on the upper portion of the Intermediate Distributing Frame required 127 feet of scaffolding for the installers. Coordination with emergency communications services were done to not loss a phone call. Real-time cutting reveals the time. Account Representative Rick Snowden and supervisor Gary Brennan are shown. Mary Ellen and Don are not properly identified in their roles.

Notable employees

References

Bibliography
 Adams, Stephen B., and Orville R. Butler. Manufacturing the Future: A History of Western Electric. Cambridge: Cambridge University Press, 1999. .
Fagen, M. D., ed. A History of Engineering and Science in the Bell System: Volume 1 The Early Years (1875–1925). New York: The [Bell Telephone] Laboratories, 1975. .
Fagen, M. D., ed. A History of Engineering and Science in the Bell System: Volume 2 National Service in War and Peace (1925–1975)''. New York: The [Bell Telephone] Laboratories, 1978. .

External links

 Western Electric brand audio vacuum tubes
 Western Electric Dial Telephone Models
 Western Electric Historical Background, History of theater sound products
 The Papers of Ernest Galen Andrews at Dartmouth College Library
 Western Electric History (from Bell System Memorial), History of theater sound products
 

Alcatel-Lucent
American companies established in 1869
American companies disestablished in 1996
Bell System
Companies based in Manhattan
Defunct manufacturing companies based in New York City
Manufacturing companies established in 1869
Manufacturing companies disestablished in 1996
Defunct telecommunications companies of the United States
History of Chicago
Telecommunications companies disestablished in 1996
1881 mergers and acquisitions
Telecommunications equipment vendors
Defunct manufacturing companies based in Illinois
Academy Award for Technical Achievement winners